Stereocaulon intermedium is a species of snow lichen belonging to the family Stereocaulaceae.

Ecology
Stereocaulon intermedium is a known host to the lichenicolous fungus species:

 Arthonia stereocaulina
 Catillaria stereocaulorum
 Cercidospora stereocaulorum
 Lasiosphaeriopsis stereocaulicola
 Polycoccum trypethelioides
 Taeniolella christiansenii

References

Stereocaulaceae
Taxa named by Vsevolod Savich
Taxa described in 1923